An intelligence engine is a type of enterprise information management that combines business rule management, predictive, and prescriptive analytics to form a unified information access platform that provides real-time intelligence through search technologies, dashboards and/or existing business infrastructure.  Intelligence Engines are process and/or business problem specific, resulting in industry and/or function-specific marketing trademarks associated with them.  They can be differentiated from enterprise resource planning (ERP) software in that intelligence engines include organization-level business rules and proactive decision management functionality.

History
The first intelligence engine application appears to have been introduced in 2001 by Sonus Networks, Inc. in their patent US6961334 B1. Applied to the field of telecommunications systems, the intelligence engine was composed of a database queried by a data distributor layer, received by a telephony management layer and acted upon by a facility management command & control layer. This combined standalone business intelligence tools like a data warehouse, reporting and querying software and a decision support system.

The concept was reinforced in 2002 in patent application US20030236689 A1 which applied predictive quantitative models to data and used rules to correlate context data at different stages of the business process with business process outcomes to be presented to end users.

LogRhythm Inc. advanced the concept in 2010 by adding event managers to the end of the intelligence engine's process to determine reporting, remediation and other outcomes.

In 2016, professional service company KPMG continued to advance the concept by commercializing intelligence engines with the introduction of Third Party Intelligence, which is differentiated from past intelligence engines in its increased use of embedded intellectual property, diversity of global data inputs and focus on predictive analytics to mitigate risk and yield cost savings.

Traits
As a system that combines human intelligence, data inputs, automated decision-making and unified information access, intelligence engines are an advancement in business intelligence tools because they: 
 integrate structured data and unstructured content in a single index
 provide advanced workflow automation that can trigger multiple business processes
 project future impact of data such as supply chain threats
 recommend best actions / highlight opportunities for process improvement
 leverage business intelligence from a variety of experts 
 combine human expertise with the power of technology to deliver actionable intelligence
 scale data visualization capabilities with the number of users

Applications
 Attivio Active Intelligence Engine
 KPMG Spectrum Intelligence Engine(s)
 Salesforce Service Cloud Intelligence Engine 
 FireEye Threat Intelligence Engine
 Factiva Intelligence Engine
 Parasoft Process Intelligence Engine

See also
 Business intelligence (BI)
 Business intelligence tools 
 Business rule management system
 Data mining
 Data science
 Decision management 
 Enterprise information management 
 Predictive analytics 
 Prescriptive analytics

References

Data management
Information management
Big data
Business terms
Business intelligence
Information systems